Marina Giral Lores (born 4 September 1990) is a Venezuelan former professional tennis player.

Born in Maracaibo, Giral Lores represented the Venezuela Fed Cup team in a total of eight ties between 2006 and 2011. She also represented her country at the 2007 Pan American Games.

On the professional tour, she reached a best singles ranking of No. 283 in the world and won two ITF titles, including a $25k tournament in 2009, the Open Bogotá.

Giral, who is based in Miami, retired from professional tennis in 2012.

ITF Circuit finals

Singles: 12 (2 titles, 10 runner-ups)

Doubles: 5 (1 title, 4 runner-ups)

Notes

References

External links
 
 
 
 Marina Giral at Tennis Explorer

1990 births
Living people
Venezuelan female tennis players
Sportspeople from Maracaibo
Pan American Games competitors for Venezuela
Tennis players at the 2007 Pan American Games
South American Games medalists in tennis
South American Games silver medalists for Venezuela
Competitors at the 2006 South American Games
21st-century Venezuelan women